Riadh Shawki (1893 – 16 October 1943) was an Egyptian footballer. He competed at the 1920 Summer Olympics and the 1924 Summer Olympics.

References

External links
 

1893 births
1943 deaths
Egyptian footballers
Egypt international footballers
Olympic footballers of Egypt
Footballers at the 1920 Summer Olympics
Footballers at the 1924 Summer Olympics
Place of birth missing
Association football midfielders
Al Ahly SC players